Simon Triantafillou (born August 25, 1999) is a Canadian professional soccer player who plays for Canadian Premier League club Pacific FC.

Early life
Triantafillou joined the youth system of Sigma FC at age 11. He later had a two-week trial with Belgian club Genk.

College career
In 2017, he committed to attend Syracuse University, where he would play for the men's soccer team. He recorded his first assist on October 25, 2017, against the Boston College Eagles. He scored his first goal on September 6, 2019, against the Yale Bulldogs. In 2020, for his senior season, he was named team captain, and he was named to the All-ACC Academic Team. He was also awarded the Dean Foty Award, which is awarded to the Syracuse player with the most positive influence on the team's attitude.

After graduating from Syracuse, he moved to Providence College for a graduate degree and played for the men's soccer for his final season of eligibility. He scored his only goal on October 13 in a 3–0 win against the number 1 ranked Georgetown Hoyas. He appeared in 21 matches for Providence, leading the team that season with six assists.

Club career
He played in League1 Ontario with Sigma FC. With Sigma, he served as team captain for a period. He scored his first goal on May 18, 2018, against Master's FA.

In February 2022, he signed a contract with Canadian Premier League club Forge FC,  ahead of their CONCACAF Champions League matches against Cruz Azul, but did not appear in either match.

In April 2022, he signed a contract with Pacific FC of the Canadian Premier League, immediately being loaned to fellow CPL club FC Edmonton.

International career
In 2014, he attended a national team camp for the Canada U15 team.

References

External links

1999 births
Living people
Association football midfielders
Canadian soccer players
Soccer people from Ontario
Sportspeople from Burlington, Ontario
Canadian people of Greek descent
Syracuse Orange men's soccer players
Providence Friars men's soccer players
League1 Ontario players
Canadian Premier League players
Sigma FC players
Forge FC players
Pacific FC players
FC Edmonton players